James Conway (born 31 March 1981) is a Gaelic footballer who plays for the Derry county team, with whom he has won a National League title. He plays his club football for Ballinderry Shamrocks. He was part of the Ballinderry team that won the 2002 All-Ireland Senior Club Football Championship, and he has also won four Derry Championships and an Ulster Senior Club Football Championship with the club. For club and county he plays in midfield.

Playing career

Inter-county
He was first called up to the Derry Senior panel by then-manager Eamonn Coleman in late 2000 ahead of the 2000–2001 National Football League. He was instrumental in Derry winning the 2008 National League, where Derry beat Kerry in the final. He however could not play in the final due to a work related injury.

Club
Conway struggled to make both the Ballinderry and school (St Pat's, Maghera) team at underage level, even being forced to play as goalkeeper as a couple of seasons around Under 16 level for Ballinderry. He however made the Ballinderry senior panel when he was 17. He won his first Derry Senior Football Championship in 2001 and Ballinderry went on to win that year's Ulster Senior Club Football Championship, and the All-Ireland Senior Club Football Championship the following March. He has won further Derry Championship medals with the club in 2002, 2006 and 2008.

Honours

Inter-county
National Football League:
Winner (1): 2008
Dr McKenna Cup:
Winner (1): 2011

ClubAll-Ireland Senior Club Football Championship:Winner (1): 2002Ulster Senior Club Football Championship:Winner (1): 2001
Runner up: 2006, 2008Ulster Senior Club Football League:Winner (1): 2008Derry Senior Football Championship:Winner (4): 2001, 2002, 2006, 2008
Runner up: 1999?, 2000?, 2003Derry Senior Football League:Winner (at least 4):''' 2005, 2006, 2007, 2008
Numerous underage competitions

Note: The above lists may be incomplete. Please add any other honours you know of.

References

External links
Player profiles on Official Derry GAA website
Ballinderry Shamrocks GAC

1981 births
Living people
Ballinderry Gaelic footballers
Derry inter-county Gaelic footballers